Gustakh Dil ( Audacious Heart) is an Indian television soap opera which premiered on 5 August 2013 and ended on 4 November 2014. It is a remake of Bengali series Bou Kotha Kao and was aired on Life OK during weekdays. It showed the stories of Laajo, Nikhil and Ishana.

Laajo is a simpleton from a village, and Nikhil is a cool guy who is madly in love with his childhood sweetheart Ishana. Laajo becomes a second woman in Nikhil's life.

Plot

Nikhil plans to celebrate his birthday in Sonbarsa where Nikhil's grandfather and aunt (bua) live. He plans to go with his childhood sweetheart Ishana but she refuses. There he meets a challenging but simple girl named Laajo who lives with her mother and sisters. Nikhil and Laajo clash playfully on several occasions. A number of circumstances lead Nikhil to unwillingly marry Laajo and bring her to the city with him.

Laajo struggles to fit in with Nikhil and his family, unaware of how things in a modern house work. Gradually, she tries to build an equation with him and his family.

Nikhil becomes annoyed with Laajo for not informing him about her trip to Sonbarsa. Kunal wishes to get engaged to Ishana. Nikhil reads Laajo's letter becoming dejected on learning that Laajo has left him so he can reunite with Ishana. He visits Sonbarsa and after many attempts, wins Laajo's heart. The two are deeply in love while Barkha has sworn to never let Laajo return to her house. Laajo becomes a star with the help of Sagar and Anjali. She takes up the stage name of Trishna. At last Barkha accepts Laajo. Ayesha marries Adhiraj.

The show ends on a happy note with Radha and LD coming to promote their show Mere Rang Mein Rangne Waali which replaced Gustakh Dil.

Cast 
 Sana Amin Sheikh as Laajwanti "Laajo" Bhardwaj / Trishna
 Vibhav Roy as Nikhil Bhardwaj
 Parvati Sehgal as Ishana, Nikhil's girlfriend
 Shritama Mukherjee as Jasmine
 Soni Singh as Anaya
 Rumi Khan as Indrasena
 Meghna Malik as Barkha Bhardwaj, Nikhil's mother
 Indraneel Bhattacharya as Inder Bhardwaj, Nikhil's father
 Rajiv Kumar as Samrat, Nikhil's uncle
Ankita Sharma as Nikhil's Maami
 Garima Vikrant Singh as Saraswati, Laajo's mother
 Sushil Bounthiyal as Ram Bachan, Laajo's father
 Siddhant Karnick as Sagar Khurana, Superstar and Laajo's mentor
 Shraddha Jaiswal as Ayesha Adhiraj Ranawat
 Jyoti Sharma as Gunja Bhardwaj
 Eva Ahuja as Anjali, Samrat's ex-wife 
 Ankush Arora as Rishi, Samrat's son
 Leena Jumani as Ratri Sharma
 Scott Adkins as Bhattacharya
 Tanushree Kaushal / Anushka Singh as Aditi, Ishana's mother
 Sayantani Ghosh as Aarohi Sagar Khurana
 Sharhaan Singh as Siddharth
 Faisal Raza Khan as Kabir
 Chaitanya Choudhury 
 Namrata Thapa
 Iqbal Azad
 Anita Kanwal as Nanima
 Shahrukh Sadri as Sagar's manager

References

External links
 Gustakh Dil on Hotstar

2013 Indian television series debuts
Indian television soap operas
Indian drama television series
Life OK original programming
2014 Indian television series endings